Hazel Irvine (born 24 May 1965) is a Scottish sports presenter.

Early life
Irvine was born in St Andrews, Scotland. Educated at Hermitage Academy in Helensburgh, she achieved an MA in History of Art at the University of St. Andrews, and competed in golf, netball and athletics at university level. In her final year she was Senior Student of Hamilton Hall.

Broadcasting career
Irvine began her broadcasting career in radio, before moving to work for Scottish Television in 1988 as a continuity announcer and latterly, as a sports reporter/presenter. This led to slots on the national ITV network co-presenting coverage of the 1988 Olympics alongside Dickie Davies, and presenting reports from the Scotland football team's training camp at the 1990 World Cup.

Irvine joined the BBC in 1990, working as presenter on BBC Scotland's Sportscene programme and becoming the youngest-ever presenter of the BBC's flagship sports programme Grandstand on 19 June 1993. She also anchored BBC Scotland's coverage of Children in Need for ten years. In 1994, Irvine co-hosted the BBC's Hogmanay Live, and in 1995 she introduced coverage of the FIFA Women's World Cup and began reporting for Football Focus. Irvine has presented for the BBC at every Summer Olympics since Barcelona 1992, as well as five Winter Olympics and four FIFA World Cup tournaments. In December 1996, she became the lead presenter of Ski Sunday, initially with Julian Tutt, but then alone from 1997. She is also a regular presenter of the Triple Crown snooker tournaments (the World Snooker Championship, the Masters and the UK Championship) since 2002 and has regularly presented the sports news on major BBC evening news bulletins, as well as reporting on events such as Wimbledon and the London Marathon.

In August 2008, Irvine presented Olympic Breakfast as well as being one of the commentators for the opening and closing ceremonies of the 2008 Olympics in Beijing. She reprised these roles for the 2012 Games in London.

Irvine also presented BBC coverage of the Winter Olympics in 2014 and 2018, the Commonwealth Games in 2014 and 2018 and the 2016 Olympics in Rio de Janeiro.

Irvine covered golf for the BBC as a reporter and presenter for 25 years, finishing with the Masters in April 2017.

Irvine also presented the 2019 Netball World Cup from Liverpool for the BBC.

Other interests
Irvine also works as a media-trainer and after-dinner speaker.

Personal life 
Irvine married her long-term boyfriend, whose identity has always been kept private, at a private ceremony in Scotland in 2008. The couple live in London with their daughter, Gina, who was born in 2008.

References

External links 
 Olympic impressions - Hazel Irvine BBC Press Office, 19 June 2008
 Hazel Irvine profile BBC Sport, 19 November 2008
 Irvine part of record Sochi torch relay BBC Sport, 8 October 2013

1965 births
Alumni of the University of St Andrews
Living people
People from St Andrews
Scottish television presenters
Scottish women television presenters
British sports broadcasters
BBC sports presenters and reporters
Tennis commentators
Olympic Games broadcasters
Golf writers and broadcasters
People educated at Hermitage Academy